Guillet is a surname. Notable people with the surname include:

 Adolphe Guillet dit Tourangeau (1831–1894), Quebec notary and politician 
 Amedeo Guillet (1909–2010), Italian Army officer
 Jean-Jacques Guillet (born 1946), French politician
 Léon Guillet (1873–1946), French metallurgist
 Louis Guillet (1788–1868), Quebec notary and politician
 George Guillet (1840–1926), Canadian politician
 Melissa Guillet (born 1975) is a poet, writer, and illustrator
 Pernette Du Guillet (c.1520–1545), French poet
 Valère Guillet (1796–1881), Quebec notary and politician

See also
 Gullett